The men's 200m individual medley SM7 event at the 2008 Summer Paralympics took place at the Beijing National Aquatics Center on 7 September. There were two heats; the swimmers with the eight fastest times advanced to the final.

Results

Heats
Competed from 10:16.

Heat 1

Heat 2

Final
Competed at 19:10.

 
Q = qualified for final. WR = World Record.  DQ = Disqualified.

References
 
 

Swimming at the 2008 Summer Paralympics